Jim Carlin may refer to:
 Jim Carlin (baseball)
 Jim Carlin (politician)